The 1948–49 Yugoslav Ice Hockey League season was the eighth season of the Yugoslav Ice Hockey League, the top level of ice hockey in Yugoslavia. Nine teams participated in the league, and Mladost have won the championship.

Regular season

Group A

Group B

Group C

References

External links
Yugoslav Ice Hockey League seasons

Yugo
Yugoslav Ice Hockey League seasons
1948–49 in Yugoslav ice hockey